Craig Aloysius Montoya (born September 14, 1970) is the bassist of Castella and Tri-Polar and former bassist of Everclear.

Early life
Montoya was born in Spokane, Washington, the son of Daniel and Marge Montoya. He has an older brother named Dave, and an older sister named Tami; their parents later divorced.

Montoya attended Mead Senior High School, where his friends included "drug-users and musicians." When he was seventeen, the local law enforcement raided his home. He was not arrested at that point, but later was for a DUI. After spending some time in jail, Montoya knew "[he] didn't want to spend the rest of [his] life behind bars." From that point on, he has rehabbed and has successfully remained clean.

Career
From an early age, Montoya wanted to play music. Though he was originally interested in the drums, a lack of bass guitarists in the area led him to choose the instrument. He bought his first bass guitar and amp when he was sixteen, with money he earned mowing lawns. After graduating high school, Montoya joined a band named Soul Hammer and planned a move to Portland, Oregon, but was dropped from the band once their demo tape was finished. He then looked for a bass position in The Rocket, a Northwest newspaper, and found an ad from Art Alexakis, the former lead singer of Colorfinger. Alexakis united with him and drummer Scott Cuthbert, and together they founded Everclear. The trio recorded many b-sides and performed live and local shows. In 1993, they released World of Noise, which was recorded in a friend's basement studio.

In 1994, Everclear made several changes. Cuthbert was replaced by former Jollymon drummer Greg Eklund. The band also moved from Tim/Kerr Records to Capitol. In 1995, the new Everclear released their U.S. debut album, Sparkle and Fade with singles "Heroin Girl," "Heartspark Dollarsign," "You Make Me Feel Like a Whore," and "Santa Monica". The album found an audience on the alternative rock scene, as did their 1997 follow-up, So Much for the Afterglow.

During a 1998 Australian tour, Montoya got into a heated backstage argument with Alexakis after a fan threw a lit explosive on stage, and the tour was cut short. Montoya did not join the band for the ensuing tour of the United Kingdom, with David LoPrinzi filling in.

In August 2003, after three more albums, Montoya left Everclear. In 2004, Montoya formed a new band called Tri-Polar with Sweaty Nipples members Scotty Heard on guitar and Brian Lehfeldt on drums. The band began to record in late 2004, but weeks before its self-titled release on May 27, 2005, Heard left the band for personal reasons. Looking for a replacement, Montoya turned to Kevin Hahn of Red Sector, his bandmate from The Strain. Tri-Polar is still active and plays many cities along the West Coast, including the group members' hometown of Portland.

In 2006, Montoya helped formed Castella with Hahn and frontman Ryan Andew of Sidestar.  They worked with producer Joe Chiccarelli to record How Did We Get Here during 2007. The record received praise from the critics for its songwriting and production, and several songs from the record found their way onto TV series and movie soundtracks.

Craig is also currently performing with Tacos In Hell in the Portland, OR. area. The band was founded during the pandemic in a garage. Band members include Dan Bates, Rudy Hedges, Kevin Staley, and Montoya.

References

External links
 Tri-Polar on Myspace

1970 births
Living people
American rock bass guitarists
American male bass guitarists
Everclear (band) members
Guitarists from Oregon
Musicians from Spokane, Washington
American male guitarists
21st-century American bass guitarists